Orșova is a port city on the Danube river in southwestern Romania's Mehedinți County. It is one of four localities in the county located in the Banat historical region. It is situated just above the Iron Gates, on the spot where the Cerna River meets the Danube.

Demographics

At the 2011 census, 95.2% of inhabitants were Romanians, 1.3% Czechs, 1% Roma, 0.9% Germans, 0.7% Serbs and 0.5% Hungarians.

History 

 The locality was the site of a Roman port in Dacia Malvensis, and the site of a castrum named Dierna.
 In 1925, a confusion by the scholar Nándor Fettich misplaced the important Magyar burial site discovered at Cheglevici into the Orșova region. Later, the location of that discovery, testifying to the presence of the Magyars since the early 10th century, was clarified for the archeological community.
 King Ladislaus I of Hungary decisively defeated the Cumans near Orșova in 1091.
 It was a major border fortification in the Middle Ages.
 The city was captured by Suleiman the Magnificent in 1522.
 Orșova became part of the Habsburg monarchy in 1687 at the start of an Ottoman-Habsburg War, but Ottoman forces recaptured it in 1690. The Treaty of Passarowitz gave the city back to the Kingdom of Hungary in 1718. The Treaty of Belgrade gave the city back to the Ottoman Empire in 1739. Finally, The Treaty of Sistova gave the city back to the Kingdom of Hungary in 1791. The city remained in Hungary until the end of World War I, when it became part of Romania. It was included in the Mehedinți county during the administrative reform of 1968.
 The Hungarian Crown of Saint Stephen was buried near Orșova from 1848 till 1853.
 During the works at the Iron Gates, the old center of the town was flooded and Orșova was developed (1966–1971) on higher ground, including the southern side of the Almăj Mountain and the villages of Jupalnic, Tufari, and Coramnic. Also flooded then was the neighboring Ada Kaleh, with the scattering of the mostly Turkish community of the Danube island. Ada Kaleh and its inhabitants, as well as the ancient city, are still present in the memory of its surviving locals.

Economy
The town is a center for the extraction of bentonite, chromium, and granite. The industry is centered on energy production (the hydroelectric plant), shipbuilding and engine manufacturing, assembly parts for electricity production, textiles, and the processing of feldspar, asbestos, quartz, talc, wood, etc.

The Orșova shipyard was constructed in 1890 and like a small reparation shop for the vessels which participated to the navigable channel from Iron Gate Romania- Sip Yugoslavia and had a continuously development a long time. After the year 1991 the name was changed and also the organizational profile.

A wind farm is being developed in the city territory, on a hill nearby (at 4.5 km from the agglomeration); the first turbines became active there in 2009.

Natives 
 Ignat Bednarik (1882–1963), painter
 Alexander Fölker (1956), handball player
 Stefan Fröhlich, Luftwaffe general

Image gallery

References

Populated places in Mehedinți County
Cities in Romania
Populated places on the Danube
Port cities and towns in Romania
Czech communities in Romania
Romania–Serbia border crossings
Localities in Romanian Banat